Bruce Philip Rockowitz (born October 24, 1958) is a Canadian businessman, the chairman of Rock Media International and co-founder of the Pure Group.

Early life
Rockowitz was born on October 24, 1958. He dropped out of the University of Vermont to play tennis professionally. He started in Hong Kong, and became head tennis coach at the Hong Kong Country Club, where he taught the then chairman of Li & Fung.

Career
In 1981, he co-founded Colby International with fellow Canadian Allan Zeman, and was CEO and president 1986 to 2000. In 2000, Victor Fung and Li & Fung acquired Colby for US$2.2 billion, and Rockowitz was CEO from 2011 to 2014.

Rockowitz has been vice chairman and CEO of Global Brands Group since May 2014.

He is the co-founder and non-executive chairman of The Pure Group.

Rockowitz is a member of the advisory boards for the Wharton School's Jay H Baker Retailing Center  and the Fashion Institute of Technology.

Personal life
Rockowtiz has two daughters from his first marriage. Rockowitz married Hong Kong-born American singer, Coco Lee in October 2011. Performers at the banquet included Bruno Mars.

For his 50th birthday on 24 October 2008, then fiancee Lee hosted a party at Hong Kong's Grand Hyatt hotel, guests included  Philip Green, Richard Caring, Solomon Lew, and Marc Ecko, and performers included Dita von Teese,  Lionel Richie, and Rihanna.

References

Living people
1958 births
Canadian chief executives
Canadian Jews